Taoyuan City Constituency VI includes Bade, Daxi, Fuxing, and part of Zhongli in southern Taoyuan City. The district was formerly known as Taoyuan County Constituency VI (2008-2014) and was created in 2008, when all local constituencies of the Legislative Yuan were reorganized to become single-member districts.

Current district
 Bade
 Daxi
 Fuxing
 Zhongli:
 urban villages (12 in total): Xingren(興仁里), Ziqiang(自強里), Zhongzheng(中正里), Zhongshan(中山里), Duxing(篤行里), Ren'ai(仁愛里), Renhe(仁和里), Renxiang(仁祥里), Huaxun(華勛里), Rende(仁德里), Zhongjian(中堅里), Long'an(龍安里)

Legislators

Election results

 

 
 
 
 
 
 
 
 
 
 

 

 
 
 
 
 

Constituencies in Taoyuan City